Honicknowle is an area and ward of the city of Plymouth in the English county of Devon. It borders with West Park, Crownhill, Ham, Whitleigh and Pennycross areas of Plymouth. It was previously part of Knackersknowle.

General 
The UK Census of 2001 revealed that the population stood at 9,802, although that number has likely increased significantly along with the growth of the city, of which 47.2 per cent were male and 52.8 per cent were female. (Information provided by The City of Plymouth website/Devon and Cornwall police) The 2011 census showed the ward population as 13,939.

Education

Primary schools
Knowle Primary, West Park and Chaucer Primary Schools
2009 - Knowle Primary and Shakespeare Primary (Amalgamation of West Park and Chaucer Primaries, relocated in the new building on Butt Park Playing Fields).

Secondary school
Honicknowle County Secondary Modern School 1952 - about 1989,[demolished].
John Kitto Community College now renamed as All Saints Church of England Academy Plymouth.

Shopping 
There is a small shopping precinct located at Honicknowle Green, which includes a Newsagent, Charity shop,  Hairdressers, Pharmacy, Cafe, Fish and Chip Shop and Convenience store.

In 2001 Tesco acquired the Plymco (Plymouth Co-operative) supermarket in Transit Way (also known as Transit Way Shopping Village), and since then the area has seen extensive development including a Mercedes dealership (Now relocated), Lidl, Matalan, Magnet Kitchens, Argos and B&M.

Honicknowle is also within the catchment of both West Park and Crownhill shopping precincts.

Criminal activities 
Honicknowle had quite a notorious gang culture in the mid 2000s.  On 18 April 2009, an Anti Social Behaviour Order (ASBO) was served to several senior members of the notorious Honicknowle Defence Regiment, which was at a time one of the biggest criminal organizations in the United Kingdom, banning them from associating until 19 May 2009. The de facto leader of the organization was also handed a prison sentence. However, in recent years Honicknowle has, surprisingly, had quite a low rate of crime.

Religion 
The majority religion in Honicknowle is Christian.

St. Francis of Assisi church located off Little Dock Lane is closest to Honicknowle Green. There is also a thriving Methodist Church. There is A Church of England Chapel located at St Budeaux roundabout which is a part of the Honicknowle Boundary

There is also a Jehovah's Witnesses hall located in Transit Way.

Places of interest
There are Pubs and Social Clubs located at Farm Lane and Crownhill Road. Honicknowle Green celebrated November 5 or Guy Fawkes night with a traditional bonfire and large fireworks display, most of this display was organised and funded by local citizens.
However, due to new local restrictions and regulations, there is no longer an annual bonfire.

Politics
Honicknowle is part of the Plymouth Devonport constituency, which is subject to boundary changes for the 2009/2010 general election. They are thus: northern parts, including St. Budeaux, of the current constituency will become Plymouth Moor View and the rest will join with parts of Plymouth Sutton to form Plymouth Sutton and Devonport.

The seat was won by Alison Seabeck (Labour party) in the 2005 general election.

Labour Alison Seabeck 18,610 44.3 -14.0 
 Conservative Richard Cuming 10,509 25.0 -2.1 
 Liberal Democrats Judith Jolly 8,000 19.1 +8.3 
 UK Independence Bill Wakeham 3,324 7.9 +5.6 
 Independent Keith Greene 747 1.8 N/A 
 Socialist Labour Rob Hawkins 445 1.1 +0.4 
 Respect Tony Staunton 347 0.8 N/A 
Majority 8,101 19.3  
Turnout 41,982 57.6 +1.0 
 Labour hold Swing -6.0

It is also David Owen's former seat. Owen was a founder member (one of the Gang of Four, the other three being Baroness Shirley Williams, Lord Roy Jenkins and Lord Bill Rodgers) of the SDP and then broke away to form the real SDP, when the original SDP merged with the Liberals after an electoral pact of four years.

References 

Suburbs of Plymouth, Devon